The 2021–2022 French West Indies unrest is a social conflict that took place from November 17, 2021 until March 31, 2022 in the French West Indies, particularly in Guadeloupe and Martinique. Unrest has also been reported in other Overseas Territories like Saint Pierre and Miquelon.

Following the French government's decision to introduce compulsory vaccination for health care workers and the health pass in several public places, acts of vandalism, a general strike, and demonstrations began, first in Guadeloupe and then in Martinique.

On March 31, 2022, the state of health emergency ends in the French West Indies.

History

2021 
On November 19, the prefect of Guadeloupe instituted a curfew from 6:00 p.m. to 5:00 a.m. for security reasons.

The authorities announced the closure of schools and prefectural services on November 22.

The same day, the revolt spread to Martinique.

On November 26, the Minister for Overseas France, Sébastien Lecornu, announced the postponement of the vaccination requirement until December 31 and said he was ready to "talk about the autonomy of Guadeloupe"

Gunfire, mortar fire, flaming barricades, tear gas: in the streets of the small town of Lamentin to the east of Fort-de-France, en Martinique, the aftermath of the evacuation of the roundabout du Mahault looked like a "small urban guerrilla" on the night from 1 to 2 December.

In December 2021, candidates for the 2022 French presidential election Marine Le Pen and Jean-Luc Mélenchon visited Mayotte and Guadeloupe.

On December 24, protesters briefly invaded the Regional Council of Guadeloupe and remained there overnight.

2022 
On January 3, a group of organizations opposed to the health pass and mandatory vaccination organized a "snail operation" by car, which led to traffic jams.

On January 4, a series of small roadblocks and fires were set up in the municipality of Sainte-Rose.

The same day, trade unionists from the UTS-UGTG blocked the administrative building of the University Hospital of Pointe-à-Pitre and sequestered the staff for several hours.

On January 9, the deputy of Saint-Pierre and Miquelon, Stéphane Claireaux, was attacked by anti health pass protesters. President Emmanuel Macron reacted by denouncing an "intolerable" and "unacceptable" attack.

On January 10, roadblocks were set up by demonstrators and stones were thrown at the police in Basse-Terre.

On January 11, anti health pass protesters demonstrated outside Pointe-à-Pitre university hospital and clashed with police.

On January 20, rioters injured a police officer with live ammunition on the sidelines of unauthorized demonstrations. The administrative building of the Basse-Terre hospital was invaded by about forty people.

References 

COVID-19 pandemic in France
2021 protests
2021 riots
2021 in France
2021 in politics
2022 protests
2022 riots
2022 in France
2022 in politics
Rebellions in France
French West Indies